Via Verdi are an Italian Italo disco musical group formed in 1983. They are best known for the song "Diamond" which was a number one hit on the Italian hit parade in 1986. Other hits include "Sometimes" and "You and Me". After disbanding at the end of the 1980s, Via Verdi reformed in the 2000s.

Discography

Albums
 Trailer (1987), WEA
 The Time Machine (2020), SAIFAM - CIMBARECORD

Singles
 "Diamond" (1985), WEA
 "Sometimes" (1986), WEA
 "You and Me" (1987), WEA
 "Hollywood Beyond" (1987), WEA
 "Love Is a Dream" (1989), Ricordi

References

External links

 

Musical groups established in 1983
Italian pop music groups
Italo disco groups
Musical groups from Milan